Guam lies in the path of typhoons and it is common for the island to be threatened by tropical depressions and storms, and occasional typhoons during the wet season. The highest risk of typhoons is from August through November. They can, however, occur year-round. This is a list of typhoons that caused deaths, injuries and/or severe damage on Guam.

References